Cotton paper, also known as rag paper or rag stock paper, is made using cotton linters (fine fibers which stick to the cotton seeds after processing) or cotton from used cloth (rags) as the primary material. Prior to the mid-19th century, cotton paper was the main form of paper produced, with pulp paper replacing cotton paper as the main paper material during the 19th century. Although pulp paper was cheaper to produce, its quality and durability is significantly lower. Although pulp-paper quality improved significantly over the 20th century, cotton paper continues to be more durable, and consequently important documents are often printed on cotton paper. Different grades of cotton paper can be produced.

Properties
High-quality cotton fiber paper is known to last hundreds of years without appreciable fading, discoloration, or deterioration, so it is often used for important documents, such as the archival copies of dissertations or theses. As a rule of thumb, for each percentage point of cotton fiber, a user may expect one year of resisting deterioration by use (the handling to which paper may be subjected). Legal document paper typically contains 25% cotton. Cotton paper will produce a better printout than copy paper because it can more readily absorb ink or toner.

Cotton paper is typically graded as 25%, 50%, or 100% cotton. Usually it can be checked by holding the cotton paper up to the light and looking just below the watermark for a number. 100% cotton paper may contain small amounts of acids, and should be tested or certified before use for archival documents.

Second-cut cotton linters have a normal average fiber length of 1.45 μm, and have similar properties as a short softwood pulp.

Uses
Cotton bond paper can be found at most stores that sell stationery and other office products. Some cotton paper contains a watermark. It is used for banknotes in a number of countries. These banknotes are typically made from 100% cotton paper, but can also be made with a mixture of 75% or less flax. Other materials may also be used and still be known as currency paper. Higher quality art papers are often made from cotton.

It has found extensive use as a printed circuit board substrate when mixed with epoxy resins and classified into CEM 1, CEM 2 etc.

History

Cotton was first used with a mixture of silk to make paper called Carta Bombycina. In the 1800s, fiber crops such as flax fibers or cotton from used cloths (rags) were the primary material source for paper. Beginning in the mid-19th century, wood pulp supplanted cloth; despite its lower quality, wood pulp was more readily available than cloth rags as global paper production increased. By the turn of the 20th century, most paper was made from wood pulp. Wood pulp paper durability would improve over the 20th century as bookbinders became aware of pulp paper acidity and adopted practices to counteract it, but cotton is still used for specialty papers intended for long-term preservation. As cotton rags now often contain synthetic fibers, papermakers have turned to second-cut cotton linters as raw material sources for making pulp for cotton papers.

See also
 Hemp paper
 Acid-free paper
 Inkjet paper

References

Paper
Cotton